Pardesi, the Hindi word for "foreigner", may refer to:

 Pardesi (1957 film), an Indo-Soviet film directed by Vasili Pronin and Khwaja Ahmad Abbas
 Pardesi (1970 film), an Indian drama film by Kundan Kumar
 Pardesi (1993 film), an Indian action film by Raj N. Sippy
 Shaukat Pardesi (1924–1995), Indian poet, journalist and lyricist
 Irfan Pardesi, Pakistani entrepreneur, investor and politician.

See also
 
 Paradesi (disambiguation)
 Pardes (disambiguation)
 Pardesiya, Israel